Artillery Park is a ballpark in Kingston, a suburb of Wilkes-Barre, Pennsylvania, USA. Notable tenants include the Wilkes University Colonels and the Wilkes-Barre Barons. It was the location of Babe Ruth's longest home run. It used to be the home of the Wilkes-Barre Barons of the New York–Penn League and later the Eastern League.

References

Sports in the Scranton–Wilkes-Barre metropolitan area
Baseball venues in Pennsylvania
College baseball venues in the United States
Wilkes Colonels baseball
Defunct minor league baseball venues